Josh Wilson is a British television producer and entrepreneur. He founded Wilson Worldwide Productions, a television and branded content production company. In 2016, he launched the Genisys charity. In 2018, was named in Forbes 30 under 30 Europe for entertainment.

Early life and career
Josh Wilson was born on 9 July 1990 and raised in South West London. He was educated at Esher College. From 2008 - 2012, he moved to Toronto in Canada where he worked in sales and marketing. He returned to London in 2012 and completed a short course at the Royal Academy of Dramatic Art. From 2013 – 2015 Wilson worked as a journalist for KFTV and The Knowledge.

In 2013, he founded Wilson Worldwide Productions to develop and produce content for UK-based and international broadcasters.

Wilson originated the idea for Mission Mudder (2017), on which he served as executive producer. The documentary series featured professional athletes Jade Jones (taekwondo), boxer Anthony Fowler, English cyclist Jessica Varnish, judoka Ashely McKenzie, snowboarder Aimie Fuller and hurdler Perri Shakes Drayton joining forces to take on three extreme Tough Mudder events. The series was first aired on the Sky Sports and became one of the most distributed series of the last five years.

Wilson also executive produced Chasing The Dream (2017) for Sky Sports, a documentary series about British amateur boxers, Joshua Buatsi, Lawrence Okolie and Anthony Fowler. In 2017, the company partnered with New Franchise Media in Canada to co-develop a ten part thriller for the Chinese market, adapted from the book False Impression by British novelist Jeffery Archer. Wilson also serves as a board member for Genisys, an international charity that provides training and grants to young people with ambitions to work in the arts.

References

1990 births
Living people
English television producers
English businesspeople